Thorsson may refer to:

Amund Thorsson
Bjarni Haukur Thorsson
Edred Thorsson
Guðmundur Andri Thorsson (born 1957), editor, critic, and author born in Iceland
Leif Thorsson (born 1945), Swedish jurist, judge in the Supreme Court of Sweden since 1993
Marteinn Thorsson, director of Stormland
Pierre Thorsson (born 1966), Swedish handball player who competed in three Summer Olympics
Torbjörn Thorsson
William Thorsson
Willum Thor Thorsson